HŽ series 2141 (formerly JŽ 743) was a prototype diesel shunter locomotive series of the Croatian Railways, built by Đuro Đaković. Only one was produced, but the project was later withdrawn.

External links
 2141 at zeljeznice.net 

Diesel locomotives of Croatia
Đuro Đaković (company)